Qaleh-ye Kontak (also Romanized as Qal‘eh-ye Kontak; also known as Qal‘eh-ye Kotak) is a village in Rudbar Rural District, in the Central District of Rudbar-e Jonubi County, Kerman Province, Iran. At the 2006 census, its population was 67, in 16 families.

References 

Populated places in Rudbar-e Jonubi County